Silicon Motion Technology Corporation, stylized as SiliconMotion is an American-Taiwanese company involved in developing NAND flash controller integrated circuits (ICs) for solid-state storage devices.  The company said it supplies more NAND flash controllers than any other company, over five billion from 2006 through 2016. They are found in commercial, enterprise, and industrial applications ranging from SSDs, eMMCs, memory cards, and USB flash drives.

Silicon Motion purchased Shannon Systems which added PCI Express solid-state drives for the Chinese data center market to its portfolio.  Controllers are marketed under the “SMI” brand, enterprise-grade SSDs under the “Shannon Systems” brand.

In May 2022, it was announced Silicon Motion agreed to be acquired by the US hardware company, MaxLinear for a reported US$3.8 billion.

History 
Silicon Motion Technology Corporation was formed as the combination of Silicon Motion, Inc., which was established in 1995 in Silicon Valley in the United States, and Feiya Technology Corporation, which was founded in 1997 in Taipei, Taiwan.  At the time, mobile graphic chips were the main product of Silicon Motion and NAND controllers were the main products of Feiya Technology Corporation. In 2002, Concord Asia Capital (now known as Concord Venture Capital Group), mediated the merger of the two companies which was completed in August 2002.  In 2005 the combined company was renamed Silicon Motion Technology Corporation and began listing on the NASDAQ stock market under the SIMO ticker symbol.

 November 1995: Silicon Motion was established in Silicon Valley, U.S.A.
 April 1997: Feiya Technology Corporation was established in Taipei, Taiwan. 
 August 2002: Silicon Motion, Inc. was combined with Feiya Technology Corporation in Taiwan. The headquarters was located in Hsinchu County, Taiwan.
 June 2003: Silicon Motion was added to the stock listings of the Taiwan Stock Exchange (TWSE). 
 March 2005: The company decided to go public in the US.  Silicon Motion Technology Corporation was established in the Cayman Islands, and transferred 100% of its stocks to its branch in Taiwan. The company terminated its application for an emerging stock transaction and withdrew the issuance of its stocks. 
 April 2005: The company’s listing on the TWSE was terminated.
 June 2005: The company was listed on the NASDAQ stock market (Nasdaq: SIMO).
 April 2007: The company completed its acquisition of Future Communications IC, Inc. (FCI) for US$90 million.
 December 2012: The company received "2012 Best Financially Managed Company (<$500 million revenue) Award" presented by the Global Semiconductor Alliance (GSA).
 July 2015: The company completed its acquisition of Shannon Systems for US$57.5 million. 
 December 2016: The company received "2016 Best Financially Managed Company (<$1 billion revenue) Award" presented by the Global Semiconductor Alliance (GSA). 
May 2019: The company announced that it has completed the sale of FCI, its Mobile Communications product line, to Dialog Semiconductor.
May 2022: MaxLinear to acquire Silicon Motion. Closing of the Transaction is subject to certain customary closing conditions, including regulatory approval from SAMR.

Products 

Embedded storage products
 SSD controllers
 eMMC controllers
 Ferroelectric storage
 Embedded flash controllers
 Enterprise/data center SSDs marketed under the Shannon brand
Expandable storage products
 Memory card controllers
 USB flash drive controllers
Embedded graphics products
 Embedded GPUs
 USB display controllers

References

External links 
 

1995 establishments in California
Computer companies established in 1995
Semiconductor companies of Taiwan
Hsinchu County
Companies listed on the Nasdaq
Graphics hardware companies
Announced mergers and acquisitions